"Trains and Winter Rains" is a single by Irish musician Enya, the first to be released from her 2008 studio album And Winter Came.... It premiered on the BBC Radio 2 show Wake up to Wogan on 29 September 2008. The song features Agnus Dei, a Christian verse commonly heard in churches.

Music video 
The music video was directed by Rob O'Connor, and first became available on Enya's official website on 22 October 2008. As well as Enya surrounded by neon light screens and her looking at the city night through a window as a passenger on the train, a few passengers are shown, waiting and moving around a quiet train station. There are a few shots of the New York skyline.

Charts

References

External links

Enya songs
2008 singles
Songs with music by Enya
Songs with lyrics by Roma Ryan
Reprise Records singles
2008 songs